Government is the system or group of people governing an organized community, often a state.

Government may also refer to:

 Administration (government) 
 Executive (government) (in parliamentary systems)
 Ministry (collective executive) 
 Governance
 Government (linguistics), the relationship between a word and its dependents

See also 
 List of governments
 Gov (disambiguation) 
 Governor